is a railway station in the city of Shinjō, Yamagata, Japan, operated by East Japan Railway Company (JR East).

Lines
Masukata Station is served by the Rikuu West Line, and is located 7.5 rail kilometers from the terminus of the line at Shinjō Station.

Station layout
The station has one island platform, of which only one side is in use, serving traffic in both directions. The station is unattended.

History

Masukata Station opened on December 7, 1913. The station was absorbed into the JR East network upon the privatization of JNR on April 1, 1987. A new station building was completed in March 2000.

Surrounding area
Masukata Elementary School

See also
List of railway stations in Japan

References

External links

 JR East Station information 

Stations of East Japan Railway Company
Railway stations in Yamagata Prefecture
Rikuu West Line
Railway stations in Japan opened in 1913
Shinjō, Yamagata